Russell Davis (born 1970)  is an American author born in Missouri. His publications include more than 20 novels and 30 short stories. Davis, who writes in many genres, was the president of the Science Fiction and Fantasy Writers of America (SFWA) from 2008–2010, and a member of the Western Writers of America (WWA). He has also worked as an editor and book packager.

Davis has written for publication under the names David Cian, Garrett Dylan and Dylan Garrett, D.L. Lawson, Cliff Ryder, Jenna Solitaire and Christopher Tracy as well as his real name. Cliff Ryder is a house pseudonym shared by multiple writers.

Selected works

Novels

Tom Clancy's Net Force Explorers
 Cloak and Dagger (2001) with John Helfers

Transformers
 Annihilation (2003) as David Cian 
 Fusion (2004) as David Cian

The Twilight Zone
 A Gathering of Shadows (2003)

Standalone novels
 Touchless (2002) 
 The Adventures of the Librarian: Quest for the Spear (2004) – TV movie novelization as by Christopher Tracy 
 Megawar (2005) as David Cian 
 Jersey (2013)

As by Cliff Ryder
Among the Room 59 spy novels published under the name Cliff Ryder, a house pseudonym shared by multiple writers, Davis takes credit for two for which he has been acknowledged under the pseudonym Garrett Dylan.
 Out of Time (2008)
 The Ties that Bind (2008)

Collections
 Waltzing with the Dead (2004) 
 The End of All Seasons (2013)

Anthologies edited
 Mardi Gras Madness: Tales of Terror and Mayhem in New Orleans (2000) with Martin H. Greenberg 
 Apprentice Fantastic (2002) with Greenberg 
 Transformers Legends (2004) as David Cian 
 Faerie Tales (2004) with Greenberg 
 Haunted Holidays (2004) with Greenberg  
 Millennium 3001 (2006) with Greenberg 
 If I Were An Evil Overlord (2007) with Greenberg 
 Courts of the Fey (2011) with Greenberg

Short fiction
 "Dead Tired" (1998)
 "One Tree Hill" (1998)
 "The End of Winter" (1998)
 "The Body Clock" (1999)
 "The Death of Winston Foster" (1999)
 "The End of Summer" (1999)
 "Goliath" (1999)
 "Fat Tuesday" (2000)
 "Across Hickman's Bridge to Home" (2000)
 "A Kiss at Midnight" (2001)
 "King of Thorns" (2001)
 "A Weapon of Flesh and Bone" (2001) with Tim Waggoner
 "Omega Time" (2002)
 "Countdown" (2004)
 "The Last Day of the Rest of Her Life" (2004)
 "The Hollywood Dilemma" (2005)
 "The Things She Handed Down" (2005)
 "Midnight at the Half-Life Café" (2005)
 "The Angel Chamber" (2005)
 "The End of Spring" (2006)
 "When I Look to the Sky" (2007)
 "Engines of Desire & Despair" (2007)
 "Scars Enough" (2008)
 "Houdini's Mirror" (2008)
 "An Orchid for Valdis" (2008)

References

External links
 
 
 Russell Davis at Goodreads
 
 Cliff Ryder (shared pseudonym), Jenna Solitaire, and Christopher Tracy at LC Authorities (no records as of July 2015)

1970 births
Living people
20th-century American novelists
Novelists from Missouri
21st-century American novelists
American male novelists
Date of birth missing (living people)
Place of birth missing (living people)
American male short story writers
20th-century American short story writers
21st-century American short story writers
20th-century American male writers
21st-century American male writers